Anastasios "Tom" Mardikes (born January 27, 1953) is an American sound designer and theatre educator.  He currently serves as Professor and Head of Graduate Sound Design for UMKC Theatre, an academic department of the University of Missouri-Kansas City.

Early life
Mardikes was born in Kansas City, Missouri.  He obtained a B.A. in English from the University of Missouri-Kansas City and an M.F.A. in Theatre Design and Technology (specializing in Sound Design), also at UMKC.

Career
Mardikes began teaching at the University of Missouri-Kansas City in 1978, and became Head of Graduate Sound Design for UMKC Theatre in 1986. During his tenure as Head of Graduate Sound Design, Mardikes helped to build the program into one of the most well-respected graduate sound design programs in the United States. In 2001, he was elected chair of the UMKC Department of Theatre.

As a sound designer, Mardikes has taken part in over 250 professional theatre productions.  He has served as resident sound designer for the Missouri Repertory Theatre (now the Kansas City Repertory Theatre), the Heart of America Shakespeare Festival, and the Kansas City Actors Theatre, as well as completing freelance work with the Great Lakes Theater, the Repertory Theatre of St. Louis,  the Unicorn Theatre, and many others.

During the 1990s, Mardikes developed an influential sound playback technique known as "MS-Stereo." He also took part in the creation of TixKC.com, a 1/2-price, day-of-sale virtual performing arts kiosk established as a joint project between UMKC Central Ticket Office and 11 other Kansas City-based performing arts organizations.

In addition to his career as a teacher and sound designer, Mardikes is a co-founder of the Kansas City Actors Theatre (KCAT), formed in 2004.  He is an active member of the United States Institute for Theatre Technology (USITT), where he has served as Commissioner and Vice Commissioner of Sound Design. Mardikes was also one of five professional sound designers who helped facilitate the organization of sound designers into the United Scenic Artists (USA) Local 829 which has led to the official recognition of sound design by the League of Resident Theatres (LORT) and professional theatres nationwide, as well as authoring the Sound Design examination for new designers.  Among the topics of his published writing include examinations into copyright practices and licensing for sound design in the theatre. In 1986, Mardikes founded the City Spark recording studio in Kansas City, where he served as president and producer.

References

People from Kansas City, Missouri
American sound designers
American sound editors
University of Missouri–Kansas City faculty
1953 births
Living people